Kern Carson (January 29, 1941 – March 2, 2002) was an American football halfback. He played for the San Diego Chargers and New York Jets in 1965 and for the Toronto Argonauts in 1966.

References

1941 births
2002 deaths
People from Hope, Arkansas
Players of American football from Arkansas
American football halfbacks
San Diego State Aztecs football players
San Diego Chargers players
New York Jets players
American players of Canadian football
Canadian football defensive backs
Toronto Argonauts players
Players of American football from San Diego